Patrick Gibson may refer to:

 Pat Gibson (born 1963), Irish quizzer
 Patrick Gibson (artist) (1782–1829), Scottish landscape-painter and writer on art
 Patrick Gibson, Baron Gibson (1916–2004), British businessman in the publishing industry
 Patrick Gibson (actor) (born 1995), Irish actor
 Pat Gibson (rugby league) (born 1981), Australian rugby league player